Ringsteadia is a Jurassic ammonite.

Distribution 
France, Germany, the Russian Federation and the United Kingdom

Species
 Ringsteadia anglica Salfeld, 1917
 Ringsteadia bassettensis Spath, 1935
 Ringsteadia brandesi Salfeld, 1917
 Ringsteadia evoluta Salfeld, 1917
 Ringsteadia frequens Salfeld, 1917
 Ringsteadia marstonensis Salfeld, 1917
 Ringsteadia pseudocordata Blake and Hudleston, 1877
 Ringsteadia pseudoyo Salfeld, 1917
 Ringsteadia salfeldi Dorn, 1925
 Ringsteadia sphenoidea Buckman, 1926

References 

Jurassic ammonites
Ammonitida genera
Perisphinctoidea
Aulacostephanidae